Stoltenhoff Island is a small uninhabited island in the South Atlantic Ocean, part of the Nightingale Islands. It is the smallest of the Nightingale Islands, and is to the north west of Nightingale Island itself. They are governed as part of Tristan da Cunha, an archipelago and part of the British overseas territory of Saint Helena, Ascension and Tristan da Cunha.  The island is part of the Nightingale Islands group Important Bird Area (IBA), identified as such by BirdLife International as a breeding site for seabirds and endemic landbirds.

The island is named after the two Moscow-born German brothers Gustav and Friedrich Stoltenhoff who tried to settle on nearby Inaccessible Island. Their attempt was abandoned after two difficult years.

See also
 Coins of Stoltenhoff Island (a legal tender coinage that caused controversy after being struck at Commonwealth Mint in the UK and declared legal tender by the Government of Tristan da Cunha).

References

Islands of Tristan da Cunha
Uninhabited islands of Saint Helena, Ascension and Tristan da Cunha
Important Bird Areas of Saint Helena
Seabird colonies